Matthew Klam (born 1964) is an American fiction writer and magazine journalist. 

The New Yorker named him one of the 25 best fiction writers under 40, and he has won a Guggenheim fellowship, a PEN/Robert W. Bingham Prize for Sam the Cat and Other Stories, a National Endowment of the Arts, a  Whiting Award and an O. Henry Award. His work appears in a variety of magazines, including The New Yorker, Esquire, GQ, Harper's, and The New York Times Magazine.

Klam graduated from Hollins College and the University of New Hampshire.

Selected bibliography

Books
 Sam the Cat and Other Stories (2001)
 Who Is Rich? (2017)

Stories and articles
 "European Wedding" (May 1, 2000, The New Yorker) 
 "Experiencing Ecstasy" (21 January 2001, The New York Times Magazine)
 "Fear and Laptops on the Campaign Trail" (26 September 2004, The New York Times Magazine)
 "Adina, Astrid, Chipewee, Jasmine" (15 May 2006, The New Yorker)

References

External links 
 Author website
 Interview on NPR
 Profile on Vulture
 Interview on Longform
 Profile at The Whiting Foundation
 Interview on Pedestal magazine

1964 births
Living people
American short story writers
American essayists